Lerdala is a locality situated in Skövde Municipality, Västra Götaland County, Sweden with 409 inhabitants in 2010.

It is located between Skövde and Skara. In the summer there are many more people due to the high number of summer cabins in the surrounding area. Lerdala is not to be mixed with the neighbouring village of Timmersdala. Lerdala has a school with around 100 children in the ages of 6-13, also a kindergarten.

Outside Lerdala in the Skara direction there is a bathing place which in the summer attracts a lot of people, a partying place called "Gröna lund". Also there is a golf course which is considered to be one of the hardest in the region. Sparresäter is a private school for "Nature care" it is located 5 km from Lerdala across the valley. The nature around Lerdala is amazing, formed by the ice age the landscape is almost moonlike not a flat spot. With hills, valleys, swamps, thick woods, big natural "pits" it is forbidden to "destroy" or change anything.

Notable People 

 Shy Martin, singer and songwriter
 Marcus Hellner, cross-country skier
 Johanna Frändén, sports journalist

References 

Populated places in Västra Götaland County
Populated places in Skövde Municipality